Ana María Groot de Mahecha (Bogotá, 29 August 1952) is a Colombian historian, archaeologist, anthropologist and associate professor at the Department of Anthropology of the Universidad Nacional de Colombia. Ana Mariá Groot speaks Spanish, English and French.

Biography 
Ana María Groot de Mahecha (other sources give second last name Sáenz) was born in Bogotá on 29 August 1952. She attended the Colegio Santa Francisca Romana and studied anthropology at the Universidad de los Andes, obtaining her MSc. title in 1974 with a thesis named Excavaciones Arqueológicas en Tierradentro. Estudio sobre cerámica y su posible uso en la elaboración de la sal ("Archaeological excavations in Tierradentro. Study about ceramics and its possible use in the elaboration of salt"). In 2008 Ana María Groot obtained her PhD degree in history of the Universidad Nacional de Colombia with a thesis named Trabajo y vida cotidiana en los pueblos productores de sal en el altiplano de Bogotá, siglos XVI-XVII ("Daily work and life of the salt producing peoples on the Bogotá plateau, 16th-17th centuries").

Groot has published on the archaeology and anthropology of pre-Columbian indigenous cultures such as Tierradentro, San Agustín, Nariño, Tairona and the Muisca, predominantly about their use of salt from the mines of Nemocón and Zipaquirá.

Works 
This list is a selection.

Books 
 2008 – Sal y poder en el altiplano de Bogotá, 1537-1640
 2006 – Arqueologia y patrimonio : conocimiento y apropiacion social
 1992 – Checua: Una secuencia cultural entre 8500 y 3000 años antes del presente
 1991 – Intento de delimitación del territorio de los grupos étnicos pastos y quillacingas en el altiplano nariñense
 1989 - Colombia prehispánica: regiones arqueológicas; chapters I, VIII, IX

Articles 
 2014 - Apropiación social del patrimonio arqueológico del municipio de Nemocón, Cundinamarca: un camino entre la ciencia, la sociedad y la política
 2012 - Una historia de vida entre el pasado y el presente de Colombia: Homenaje a Alicia Dussán de Reichel-Dolmatoff
 2006 - Paisajes arqueológicos relacionados con el camino principal andino (Qhapaq Ñan)
 2000 - Dieta y bioantropología de los pobladores tempranos del valle medio del río Checua
 2000 - Sal, caminos y mercaderes: el caso de los muiscas en el siglo XVI
 2000 - Caminos Precolombinos: las vías, los ingenieros y los viajeros
 1999 - Las Salinas de Zipaquirá
 1990 - Excavaciones arqueológicas en el municipio de Nemocón
 1988 – Las Federaciones de aldeas: el caso de los muiscas y de los taironas
 1986 - Generalidades sobre el poblamiento prehispánico del Parque Nacional Natural Tairona
 1983 - Ciudad Perdida: Una población serrana de los taironas

Lectures 
 2015 - La mita salinera en el Nuevo Reino de Granada y el rol de las mujeres: el caso de los muiscas en el altiplano de Bogotá

See also 

List of Muisca scholars
Muisca, salt mining
Muisca women, Nemocón, Zipaquirá, Checua

References

Notable works by Groot

Bibliography 
 
 

1952 births
Colombian anthropologists
20th-century Colombian historians
Women historians
Colombian women archaeologists
Colombian women anthropologists
20th-century Colombian women scientists
Muisca scholars
Living people
University of Los Andes (Colombia) alumni
Academic staff of the National University of Colombia
People from Bogotá
21st-century Colombian historians